Sree Shivashakthi Mahaganapathi temple is a Hindu temple dedicated to Lord Shiva, Devi Parvati and Lord Ganapathi. The temple is located at Keezhammakam, Chenkal Panchayath in Kerala, India.

References

Hindu temples in Thiruvananthapuram district